Pelusa is a 1960 Spanish musical film directed by Javier Setó.

Cast
 Enrique Benchimol 
 Francisco Bernal 
 Antoñito Candelas 
 Julio Carbayo 
 José Clavijo 
 José Cordero 
 José Luis Díaz 
 Marujita Díaz 
 Félix Fernández
 Tito García 
 Francisco González 
 Eduardo Hernández 
 Diana Lorys 
 Pepita Otero 
 Antonio Palacios
 Pedro Pescador 
 Mari Luz Real 
 Roberto Rey 
 Antonio Riquelme 
 Viviane Romance 
 Rosario Royo 
 Eduardo Ruiz 
 Espartaco Santoni 
 Salvador Soler Marí 
 Charo Tabarés 
 Ana Berta Tizón 
 Gonzalo Zamora

References

Bibliography 
 Àngel Comas. Diccionari de llargmetratges: el cinema a Catalunya durant la Segona República, la Guerra Civil i el franquisme (1930-1975). Cossetània Edicions, 2005.

External links 
 

1960 musical films
Spanish musical films
1960 films
1960s Spanish-language films
Films directed by Javier Setó
1960s Spanish films